is a Japanese male curler.

At the national level, he is a 2000 Japan men's champion.

Teams

References

External links

Living people
Japanese male curlers

Year of birth missing (living people)
Place of birth missing (living people)